Abukari Gariba (13 June 1939 – 23 January 2021) was a Ghanaian footballer born in Yamale. He competed at the 1968 Summer Olympics and the 1972 Summer Olympics. He died at the age of 81 in Kumasi on 23 January 2021.

References

External links
 

1939 births
2021 deaths
Ghanaian footballers
Ghana international footballers
Olympic footballers of Ghana
Footballers at the 1968 Summer Olympics
Footballers at the 1972 Summer Olympics
Association football forwards
Asante Kotoko S.C. players